William P. Egan is an American venture capitalist. He is the founder and general partner at Alta Communications, a venture capital firm, and Marion Equity Partners, a private equity firm, both based in Boston, Massachusetts. Egan also founded Alta's predecessor firm, Burr, Egan, Deleage & Co. (BEDCO) in 1979 and has identified and backed several of America's leading growth companies in the information technology, life sciences, and communications industries. Egan is also a limited partner, along with fellow BEDCO founder Craig Burr, at Nobska Partners, also in Boston.

Early life and education
Egan received his B.A. from Fairfield University in 1967 where he was a member of the Fairfield University Men's Rugby Football Club.  He then received an MBA from The Wharton School of the University of Pennsylvania in 1969.

Career
Egan was previously a partner at TA Associates. He began his career as a manager of Venture Capital for New England Enterprise Capital Corporation. Egan is past president and chairman of the National Venture Capital Association and serves on several boards of directors of communications, cable, and information technology companies, as well as the biopharmaceutical company Cephalon.

Egan is a long-standing member of the Fairfield University board of trustees and was honored for his contributions to the university with an Alumni Service Award in 1995. The Egan Chapel of St. Ignatius Loyola is named in honor of Egan's parents, John and Marion Egan. Egan's gifts to the university is the largest donation received by Fairfield to date. The nursing school at Fairfield University was renamed due to this donation. Egan is a trustee of University of Pennsylvania and a graduate board member of The Wharton School.

His success in the venture capital industry has a chapter dedicated to his story in the book Done Deals: Venture Capitalists Tell Their Stories.  (pp. 269–278, by Udayan Gupta, Harvard Business School Press)

Egan is an owner of the Boston Celtics through his partnership with Boston Basketball Partners LLC.

Eganis on the board for The Wharton Center for Leadership and Change Management.

Personal life
He and his wife Jacayln Egan (formerly Jacalyn Conklin) have donated large sums to Fairfield University and divide their time between Boston, Massachusetts, and Newport, Rhode Island. Egan and his wife are part-owners of the Boston Celtics of the National Basketball Association through his partnership with Boston Basketball Partners, LLC.

References

External links
Alta Communications Profile
Marion Equity Partners Profile
William Egan biography at Nobska Partners
 BusinessWeek Executive Profile
Fairfield University Alumni Service Award Profile

Fairfield University alumni
Year of birth missing (living people)
Living people
American investors
Wharton School of the University of Pennsylvania alumni
American venture capitalists
TA Associates